Trigonochlamys imitatrix is a species of predatory air-breathing land slug. It is a shell-less pulmonate gastropod mollusc in the family Trigonochlamydidae.

Trigonochlamys imitatrix is the only species in the genus Trigonochlamys. Trigonochlamys is the type genus of the family Trigonochlamydidae.

Distribution 
The distribution of Trigonochlamys imitatrix includes:
 Georgia
 Armenia
 Azerbaijan
 north-eastern Turkey (Vilayet Çoruh)

The type locality is Kutaisi, Georgia.

Description 
The size of preserved specimens is 33–62 mm. Live individuals are larger.

Ecology 
Trigonochlamys imitatrix inhabits forests.

References

Trigonochlamydidae